Stiles Oliver Clements (March 2, 1883 – January 15, 1966) was an architect practicing in Los Angeles and Southern California.

History

Clements trained at the École des Beaux-Arts, Paris. He was a key figure in the 1920s Art Deco architectural movement, and 1930s Streamline Moderne style, in Los Angeles. He also designed in historicist motifs and revivalism styles, such as the Adamson House in the Spanish Colonial Revival and Moorish Revival styles.

Stiles O. Clements was a partner with Octavius Morgan and John Walls in the firm of Morgan, Walls & Clements, known for his exuberant themed designs that included the Mayan Theater and Wiltern Theatre, and the famous Art Deco Richfield Tower. He also formed the firm of Stiles Clements & Associates.

Notable buildings
1926 Masque Theatre Building —(Present day Hayworth Theatre + La Fonda ) —  2509 Wilshire Boulevard 
1926 El Capitan Theater Building — Hollywood Boulevard, Hollywood, California.
1927: Mayan Theater — Downtown Los Angeles; Mayan Revival architecture.
1927: McKinley Building — Los Angeles (demolished 2004).
1920–1929: Chapman Market — Sixth Street, Koreatown, Los Angeles.
1929: Adamson House — Malibu, California; Spanish Colonial Revival and Moorish Revival architecture.
1929: Richfield Tower — Downtown Los Angeles, Art Deco (demolished 1969).
1929: Samson Uniroyal Tire Factory (present day Citadel Outlets mall) — City of Commerce, Southern California;  designed in Mesopotamian Revival style, inspired by the Assyrian Dur-Sharrukin (Palace of Sargon II) 
1931: Dominguez-Wilshire Building — 5410 Wilshire Boulevard, Los Angeles, (Morgan, Walls & Clements)
1931: Leimert Cinema — Leimert Park, Los Angeles 
1931: Pellissier Building and Wiltern Theatre — Wilshire Boulevard, Los Angeles; Art Deco style.
1935: Jefferson High School — South Los Angeles; Streamline Moderne style.
1936: KEHE/KFI/KECA Radio Building — Los Angeles (demolished 2003)
1938: Coulter's Department Store, Wilshire Branch —  Miracle Mile, Wilshire Boulevard, Los Angeles; moderne style (demolished 1980).
1938: Philharmonic Auditorium remodel of Clune's Auditorium for the Los Angeles Philharmonic Orchestra — Downtown Los Angeles (demolished 1980s).
1939: "Swim Gym", Beverly Hills High School — Beverly Hills, California.
1939: Facade of the refurbished Blackstone Building (Los Angeles)
1949: Mullen & Bluett Building — Miracle Mile, Wilshire Boulevard, Los Angeles; moderne style (demolished 2006); (disputed, may have been designed by son Robert Clements, Sr.) 
1954: Occidental Savings Bank, Valley Plaza, 12140 Victory Boulevard, North Hollywood, Los Angeles

References

External links

American theatre architects

Art Deco architects
Mediterranean Revival architects
Spanish Colonial Revival architects
Spanish Revival architects
Architects from Los Angeles
Architects from Maryland
1883 births
1966 deaths
Burials at Forest Lawn Memorial Park (Glendale)
20th-century American architects
People from Centreville, Maryland